Maximilienne  Guyon (1868–1903) was a French painter, water-colorist, etcher, and illustrator.

Biography
Guyon was born on 24 May 1868 in Paris. She studied with Tony Robert-Fleury, Jules Joseph Lefebvre, and Gustave Boulanger at the Académie Julian. In 1887 she made her debut at the Salon de Paris and frequently exhibited her paintings there.

In 1892 she exhibited her work at the Palais de l'Industrie in Paris. Guyon exhibited her work in the Woman's Building at the 1893 World's Columbian Exposition in Chicago, Illinois. Her work was included in the 1900 Exposition Universelle.

Guyon was a member of the Société d'aquarellistes français, the Société des Artistes Français, and the Societe des Prix du Salon et Boursiers de Voyage. She illustrated works by Honoré de Balzac, and André Theuriet. She also taught painting.

Guyon died in December 1903 in Neuilly-sur-Seine.

Gallery

References

External links
  
 Artwork by Maximilienne Guyon
 images of Maximilienne Guyon's work on ARTnet

1868 births
1903 deaths
19th-century French women artists
19th-century French painters
Académie Julian alumni
Painters from Paris